Vibe FM (98.9 FM) is a radio station in the UK as well as the Cayman Islands in the British West Indies. The station is owned by Paramount Media Services and airs an Urban Caribbean music format featuring reggae and pop music as well as specialty programs featuring jazz celeb news, pop music and Gospel music. Showbiz Journalist Mark Boardman regularly talks entertainment news on the show which goes out nationwide.

The station's most recent license was issued on 11 December 2003.
At some point in 2018, the station was re-branded from Vibe FM to IRIE FM, and by December 2021, ISLAND FM.

References

External links
 
 Vibe FM official website

Radio stations in the Cayman Islands
Radio stations established in 2001
Urban contemporary radio stations
2001 establishments in the Cayman Islands